The women's parallel slalom competition of the FIS Freestyle Ski and Snowboarding World Championships 2017 was held at Sierra Nevada, Spain on March 15 (qualifying and finals).
37 athletes from 17 countries competed.

Results

Qualification
Each participant takes one run on either of the courses. After the first run, only the top 32 are allowed a second run on the opposite course.

Elimination round

References

parallel slalom, women's